For Another Woman is a 1924 American silent drama film directed by David Kirkland and starring Kenneth Harlan, Florence Billings, and Tyrone Power Sr.

Synopsis
A New York City wastrel inherits an estate in Canada.

Cast

Preservation
A copy of For Another Woman is located in the BFI National Archive.

References

Bibliography
 Munden, Kenneth White. The American Film Institute Catalog of Motion Pictures Produced in the United States, Part 1. University of California Press, 1997.

External links

1924 films
1924 drama films
Silent American drama films
Films directed by David Kirkland
American silent feature films
1920s English-language films
Rayart Pictures films
American black-and-white films
1920s American films